Sacramento Valley Railroad may refer to:
Sacramento Valley Railroad (1852–1877), California's first railroad
Sacramento Valley Railroad (2008), a switching company in McClellan Business Park